Frank Wright (4 May 1870 – 9 December 1943) was an English cricketer who played first-class cricket for Derbyshire in 1899.

Wright was born in Ilkeston, Derbyshire. He was also identified as "Francis Moult Wright". Wright played just one first-class cricket match for Derbyshire during the 1899 season, against Surrey. He was a right-handed batsman and scored four runs in the first innings and a duck in the second. He bowled under four overs in the first innings of the match taking no wickets and giving 37 runs. Derbyshire lost the game by a ten-wicket margin.

Wright died in Cotmanhay at the age of 73.

References

1870 births
1943 deaths
English cricketers
Derbyshire cricketers
People from Ilkeston
Cricketers from Derbyshire